The Health Protection (Coronavirus, Restrictions) (All Tiers) (England) Regulations 2020 (SI 2020/1374) is an English emergency statutory instrument that replaced the second lockdown regulations from 2 December 2020. As initially made, it brought back the three-tier legal framework first introduced by the first COVID-19 tier regulations in England (in effect 14 October – 5 November 2020), but with changes to the restrictions within each tier. The regulations were sometimes referred as the "second tier regulations" or the "all tiers regulations".

Exceptions to the restrictions on gatherings were initially to be permitted during the Christmas period, defined as 23–27 December 2020. But following a continued rise in infections in London and the South East, parts of those areas were moved up to the highest level, tier 3, on 17 December (ahead of the formal review date) and on 19 December (the formal review date). On 20 December, a new tier 4 was added with restrictions similar to those of the second lockdown regulations applying to London and those parts of the South East and the East of England that were in tier 3 on the 19th. At the same time the Christmas period was reduced to Christmas Day only for tiers 1 to 3, and was abolished entirely for tier 4.

From 6 January 2021, further amendments moved all areas of England to tier 4 in what was described by politicians and the press as a third national lockdown.

The regulations were originally stated to expire on 2 February 2021, later changed to 31 March, but in the event were replaced on 29 March by The Health Protection (Coronavirus, Restrictions) (Steps) (England) Regulations 2021.

Context and earlier regulations 
In response to the developing COVID-19 pandemic, the UK government issued advice to English schools on 12 March 2020 that they should cancel trips abroad, and on 16 March that the public should avoid non-essential travel, crowded places, and visits to care homes. This was followed by the closure of schools, colleges and nurseries from 21 March.

On 21 March the government used emergency powers to make business closure regulations, enforcing the closure in England of businesses selling food and drink for consumption on the premises, as well as a range of other businesses such as nightclubs and indoor leisure centres where a high risk of infection could be expected. Five days later the restrictions were made more extensive. On 26 March 2020 the even more stringent Lockdown Regulations came into force. These became the principal delegated English legislation restricting freedom of movement, gatherings, and business closures, and were progressively relaxed on 22 April, 13 May, 1 June, and 13/15 June. The No. 2 regulations of 4 July 2020 further relaxed the rules throughout most of England, apart from City of Leicester and the surrounding area which became the subject of the first of a series of local regulations. Between July and September 2020, more extensive and increasingly rigorous ad hoc local regulations were introduced, which in many areas proved unsuccessful in controlling spread of the virus.

These were followed by the first COVID-19 tier regulations (in effect 14 October – 4 November 2020), which placed each local authority area under one of three levels of restrictions. As infections increased in many areas, these were replaced by the more rigorous nationwide second lockdown regulations (in effect 5 November – 1 December 2020).

On 2 December 2020 these regulations revoked the second lockdown regulations one day before they were due to expire, and reintroduced a countrywide three-tier legal framework. Later amendments introduced a fourth tier.

Legal basis
The regulations were made on 30 November 2020 by the Secretary of State for Health and Social Care, Matt Hancock, using emergency powers under the Public Health (Control of Disease) Act 1984, the stated legal basis being "the serious and imminent threat to public health which is posed by the incidence and spread of severe acute respiratory syndrome coronavirus 2 (SARS-CoV-2) in England". Hancock used section 45R of the Public Health (Control of Disease) Act 1984 to enact the regulations without prior parliamentary consideration, subject to retrospective approval by resolution of each House of Parliament within twenty-eight days. The regulations entered into force on 2 December 2020.

Return of the tiers
The regulations revived the three-tier legal framework from the first COVID-19 tier regulations in England, though with changes to the restrictions defined by each tier. The areas within each tier were also different: almost all of England was placed into tier 2 or 3, with only Cornwall, the Isles of Scilly, and the Isle of Wight being placed in tier 1. A fourth tier was added by SI 1611 on 20 December 2020. By 6 January 2021, all areas of England were in tier 4, where they remained until the regulations were repealed on 29 March.

A major difference to previous restrictions was that tiers were generally applied to larger areas such as counties or city regions rather than individual local authorities or smaller, this was to reduce the chances of people moving across tiers, in the original tiered areas the only exception to this was Slough because rates were "much higher" than the rest of Berkshire as well as Buckinghamshire, meaning districts like Tunbridge Wells and Ashford were placed in tier 3 even though they had lower than average rates.

Restrictions on gatherings, all tiers
In all tiers, gatherings were restricted by size. In the spaces listed, the only permitted gatherings were as follows unless one of the exceptions applied:

* For tier 3, gatherings of no more than 6 people were allowed only in free-to-access public outdoor areas, and pay-to-access public outdoor sports grounds and facilities, botanical gardens and the gardens of castles, stately homes, historic houses or other heritage sites. All gatherings in outdoor areas that did not fall within that definition were prohibited, as were all gatherings at fairgrounds and funfairs.

** For tier 4, an individual was allowed to meet one other person only in free-to-access public outdoor areas, and pay-to-access botanical gardens and the gardens of castles, stately homes, historic houses or other heritage sites, as well as sculpture parks and allotments. All gatherings in outdoor areas that did not fall within that definition were prohibited, as were all gatherings at fairgrounds and funfairs.

Large gathering offence 
On 29 January 2021 SI 97/2021 introduced a new 'large gathering offence' subject to penalty charges on a sliding scale between £400 and £6400. The offence was committed when the above restrictions were breached by more than 15 people gathered in a private dwelling, in educational accommodation, or at an indoor rave.

Exceptions to the restrictions on gatherings

General and tier 1 exceptions 
A substantial list of exceptions was provided for. All applied to tier 1, with more limited and fewer exceptions applying to tiers 2, 3 and 4.

Tier 2 exceptions 
These were the same as for tier 1 except as follows:

 "Other sports": organised outdoor sports were still exempt, but organised fitness activities were not
 "Outdoor activities": outdoor physical activities involving a licence or permit
 Additional indoor exceptions were provided to the general tier 2 rule prohibiting gatherings in private indoor spaces:

Tier 3 exceptions 
These were largely the same as tier 2 but there was no exception for wedding and civil partnership receptions.

Tier 4 exceptions 
These were the same as tier 3 with the following exceptions:

 No 'permitted organised gatherings'
 Wedding or civil partnership ceremonies were limited to six people
 Commemorative events following a death were limited to six people
 No special Christmas arrangements, thus normal tier 4 rules applied on 25 December 2020.

Restrictions on leaving home in tier 4 
As originally made, SI 1374 controlled social interactions by imposing rules on gatherings; there was no general prohibition against leaving home. The amendments introduced on 20 December 2020 by SI 1611, however, brought in a new tier 4 with much stricter rules, very similar to those of the second lockdown in place between 5 November and 2 December. There remained no general prohibition against leaving home in tiers 1 to 3.

In tier 4 the general rule was that no-one is allowed to leave or be outside their own home (which included any associated garden or yard) without "reasonable excuse". No exhaustive definition of "reasonable excuse" was provided, though it included any of the following exceptions:

Reasonable excuses for leaving home in tier 4

Exception 1: leaving tier 4 home necessary for certain purposes 
This exception covered a variety of situations:

Movement between tiers
There was no general prohibition against leaving a home tier area, or against movement between tiers. An individual who travelled between tiers to join a gathering was generally subject to the rules of their home tier, or the tier of the place to which they travelled, whichever was higher. Anyone living in tier 1, 2 or 3 was permitted to travel to a higher tier area, but could not participate in a gathering that was prohibited in the higher tier area. Anyone living in tier 2, 3 or 4 who travelled to a lower tier area could not participate in any gathering that would have been prohibited in their home area. As noted above, people resident in tier 4 were permitted to leave home and travel only if they had a 'reasonable excuse' to do so.

Business closures
Certain businesses were required to close or limit their operations.

General and tier 1 business restrictions

Tier 2 business restrictions 
The tier 1 list of businesses that must close and the opening hour restrictions also applied in tier 2. In addition, there were the following restrictions:

Tier 3 business restrictions 
The tier 1 and tier 2 lists of businesses that must close also applied in tier 3. In addition, there were the following restrictions:

Tier 4 business restrictions 
These were similar but not identical to those of the second lockdown that was in place between 5 November and 2 December.

Linked households 
The concept of "linked households" (referred to in government statements as "support bubbles") was brought forward from previous regulations, but in extended form. Two households that were linked under these regulations could generally meet as if they were one household.  First and second households could link if all the adults in both households agree. The first household had to comprise:

A single adult
Any number of children and no adults
One adult and any number of children who were under the age of 18 on 12 June 2020
Any number of adults and a child who was under the age of one on 2 December 2020
Any number of adults and a child with a disability requiring continuous care, the child being under the age of five on 2 December 2020
One or more persons with a disability requiring continuous care, on their own or together with any number of individuals who do not have such a disability (but only one of the non-disabled individuals may be aged 18 or over on 12 June 2020).
Where the first household included a higher education student on vacation, the presence of the student was ignored for this purpose.

There were no limits on the second household, which could include any number of adults and children.

A household could only be linked with one other household at any one time. But for the first time, linked households could be changed if all members of a linked household agreed; this was subject to a minimum 14 day period (reduced to 10 days from 14 December 2020) between the final meeting of the former linked households and the first meeting of the new.

Linked childcare households 
The concept of "linked childcare households" was brought forward from previous regulations. It was separate from "linked households".

A household with at least one child aged 13 or under could link with another household providing informal childcare (formal childcare, for example by a childminder, was excluded). Only one linked childcare household was permitted at any one time, and all adults in both households had to agree. Changes to the linking were allowed subject to a minimum 14 day period (reduced to 10 days from 14 December 2020) between the final meeting of the former linked childcare households and the first meeting of the new.

Linked Christmas households 
As originally made, the regulations provided for more relaxed Christmas rules on gatherings during the 'Christmas period', defined as 23–27 December 2020, but three days before they were due to enter into effect SI 1611 altered the definition and restricted the Christmas period to 25 December only. The amended Christmas rules given below applied to tiers 1 to 3 only; there were no special Christmas arrangements in tier 4.

The Christmas rules introduced a new concept of "linked Christmas households", separate from "linked households" and 'linked childcare households".

One or more members of one household could form a linked Christmas household with one or more members of no more than two other households from a tier 1, 2 or 3 area, regardless of size, to form a linked Christmas household for the purpose of gathering during the Christmas 2020 period, if all people to be linked agreed. Two households that were already linked households counted as one household for this purpose. A person could be a member of only one linked Christmas household, except that a child who did not live in the same household as both parents could be a member of a linked Christmas household formed by each parent. There was a special exception for higher education students on vacation.

Linked Christmas households were exempted from some of the restrictions on gatherings on 25 December. During that period, gatherings of no more than three linked Christmas households were permitted provided that they took place in a private dwelling, a place of worship or a public outdoor place (defined as anywhere the public are admitted free of charge, as well as outdoor sports grounds, botanical gardens, gardens or grounds of a castle, stately home, historic house or other heritage site, but excluding fairgrounds and funfairs). Attendees could also travel together, as gatherings in conveyances were permitted.

A Christmas gathering could extend beyond the Christmas period (25 December) in the event that an attendee could not return home due to unforeseen travel disruption.

These Christmas-specific rules were revoked on 19 January 2021.

Declaration on leaving the United Kingdom 
On 8 March 2021, SI 2021/247 introduced a new requirement for travellers leaving the United Kingdom to have with them a completed travel declaration form when they arrived at an embarkation point. On the form, the traveller had to give a variety of personal details, to state the reason for being away from home, and to certify that the information provided was true. Anyone who failed to complete a form and who did not do so when directed by an authorised person could may be required to return home or leave the embarkation point without departing from the UK. Failure to comply was an offence. The regulations provided a long list of travellers who were exempt, including diplomats, essential government workers, transit passengers, hauliers, seamen, aircraft crews and channel tunnel workers.

Reviews and expiry 
The Secretary of State had to review the need for the restrictions every 28 days, and also the applicability of the tier areas every 14 days.

Areas were moved up ahead of the first formal review date and Matt Hancock said that the data would be reviewed every week hence there being a review on 23 December (coming into effect on Boxing Day).

The regulations were originally stated to expire at the end of 2 February 2021, later moved to 31 March 2021. They were ultimately repealed on 29 March 2021 and replaced by The Health Protection (Coronavirus, Restrictions) (Steps) (England) Regulations 2021.

Enforcement 
Breaches of the regulations were offences and could be prosecuted or dealt with by fixed penalty notices with penalties ranging up to £10,000 for repeated violations.

Inconsistency in application by government officials

British government staff Christmas parties controversy

In December 2021, it was reported that a number of social gatherings of United Kingdom government staff had occurred in the run-up to Christmas during the period when the restrictions detailed above were in force. The government denied any rules were broken but commenced an investigation into whether any breaches of the rules had occurred.

Inconsistencies regarding application of exercise rules
The regulations did not define what constitutes exercise, nor how far an individual could travel to in order to undertake exercise. Government guidelines stated that individuals should exercise in their "local area", but there was no such requirement in the regulations. Similarly, the guidelines stated that exercise "should be limited to once per day", but the regulations did not require or even mention such a thing.

On 6 January 2021 fixed penalty notices were handed to two women by Derbyshire Police, reportedly for travelling  to go for a walk. The police force subsequently stated that it was reviewing the action based on new national guidelines, but issuance of the notices was nevertheless supported by the health secretary, Matt Hancock. This led to calls for greater clarity as to what travel was legally permitted for the purpose of exercise. Four days later it was announced that the notices had been revoked and that Derbyshire Police had apologised to the women.

It was reported that on 10 January 2021 Boris Johnson had been seen cycling in the Queen Elizabeth Olympic Park,  from Downing Street. Metropolitan Police Commissioner Dame Cressida Dick stated that the trip had not been "against the law - that's for sure" but called for greater clarity in the regulations.

Effectiveness 
As of data week commencing 7 December 2020 all tier 3 areas other than Kent and Medway improved, The areas with the largest increases from wc 17 December to wc 9 December include Kent and Essex, those with the largest decreases include the Humber and the Bristol area. In the week from 30 November to 6 December, of individual districts 7 out of 10 tier 2 districts had increased compared with only 3 in 10 in tier 3. Hastings and Maldon districts had the highest increase.

Summary of main changes, by date 
This chronological table lists the main changes to the second tier regulations.

Local authority areas in each tier, by date 
This table lists the dates during which specific areas fell within each tier.

References

Bibliography

External links
 Guidance: Local restriction tiers: what you need to know – Department of Health and Social Care, 30 November 2020, updated 19 December
 Guidance: Closing certain businesses and venues in England – Cabinet Office, updated 24 December 2020
 Guidance: National lockdown – Cabinet office, 4 January 2021, updated 8 March
 Guidance: Children of critical workers and vulnerable children who can access schools or educational settings – referred to as "the relevant guidance" in SI 8 (2021) – Department for Education, updated 5 January 2021

Data 
 Original tiers
 10 December (week 26 November-2 December) East Midlands, East of England, London, North East, North West, South East, South West, West Midlands, Yorkshire and the Humber
 17 December (for tiers as of 19 December) East Midlands, East of England, London, North East, North West, South East, South West, West Midlands, Yorkshire and the Humber
 23 December (for tiers as of 26 December) East Midlands, East of England, London, North East, North West, South East, South West, West Midlands, Yorkshire and the Humber
 30 December (week 17 December-23 December, for tiers as of 31 December) East Midlands, East of England, London, North East, North West, South East, South West, West Midlands, Yorkshire and the Humber

Statutory Instruments of the United Kingdom
2020 in England
2021 in England
COVID-19 pandemic in England
Public health in the United Kingdom
2020 in British law
Law associated with the COVID-19 pandemic in the United Kingdom
Country subdivisions lockdowns